Salam Academy is an Islamic PreK–high school in Richardson, Texas. It was established as a part-time school in 2003 and added a full-time school in fall 2008. As of 2014 it had 315 students, 90% being South Asian, 5% being Arab, and 5% being non-Hispanic white, Hispanic, and Black. It is not affiliated with any particular mosque.

References

External links
Salam Foundation

Islamic schools in Texas
High schools in Richardson, Texas
Richardson, Texas
Private K-12 schools in Dallas County, Texas
2003 establishments in Texas
Educational institutions established in 2003
Islamic organizations established in 2003
Educational institutions established in 2008
Islamic organizations established in 2008